The 2005 Boxing World Cup was held in Moscow, Russia from July 12 to July 17.

Group 1

Cuba-Thailand

Cuba-Romania

Romania-Thailand

Final ranking

Group 2

Russia-Belarus

United States-Belarus

Russia-United States

Final ranking

Group 3

Georgia-Kazakhstan

Georgia-Africa

Africa-Kazakhstan

Final ranking

Group 4

Azerbaijan-South Korea

Ukraine-South Korea

Azerbaijan-Ukraine

Final ranking

Semifinals

Azerbaijan-Russia

Cuba-Kazakhstan

Final

Cuba-Russia

Notes

External links
 The official link of the AIBA World Cup 2005
 The result page of the AIBA World Cup 2005
 The dates page
 The scores and participants of the final fights (Russian)
 amateur-boxing

Boxing World Cup
World Cup
Boxing World Cup
International boxing competitions hosted by Russia
Sports competitions in Moscow
July 2005 sports events in Europe